Nisha Pillai is an Indian journalist based in London. She is a main news anchor for BBC World News.

Early life
Pillai was born in Kolkata, India, and grew up in Mumbai. When she was 14, her family moved to London, England. She attended a girls school in Birmingham, then graduated in analytical economics at the London School of Economics.

Her mother Nita Pillai (née Mookherjee) was the younger daughter of industrialist Sir Biren Mookerjee and Lady Ranu Mookherjee, an impresario and an associates of Rabindranath Tagore. Her paternal grandfather was the former Ambassador of India to France, Sir Narayanan Raghavan Pillai.

Career
After university, she joined Schroders Investment Bank, then moved into journalism with the weekly Investors Chronicle. Pillai joined the BBC in 1986, first working on The Money Programme, then Panorama from 1990 to 1995.  Her nine-month investigation into financial affairs of media proprietor Robert Maxwell was presented as "The Max Factor", which won an award from the Royal Television Society in 1991.

She joined the BBC World News channel in 1995 as one of the main anchors, presenting the hourly news reports. In 1997, she presented the channel's coverage of Pakistan's 50th anniversary of independence in Islamabad, and, from Jerusalem in 1998, Israel's 50th anniversary of its declaration of independence. Pillai gave live coverage of the September 11 attacks and the fall of Baghdad. She has also hosted live interactive debates between audiences in America and in connected studios in Pakistan and Jordan.

She has also presented the BBC's flagship interview programme HARDtalk, and listed her interviewees as including Hindu nationalist Bal Thackeray of the Shiv Sena, musician Phil Collins, writer V. S. Naipaul and Bollywood megastar Amitabh Bachchan.

Pillai coaches senior executives in presentation skills at London Business School, records podcast interviews on economic analysis for a ratings agency, and facilitates many conferences and economic forums. She counts her understanding of economics and mental arithmetic among her strong points.

Personal life
She has two children, one called Kiran, and visits India regularly.

References

Further reading
 Performing Artistes, "Nisha Pillai" biography
 BBC Press Office, Nisha Pillai, biography
 BBC News, "Nisha Pillai", profile

External links 
 http://www.nishapillai.com—Nisha Pillai Website
 

Writers from Kolkata
BBC newsreaders and journalists
BBC World News
Indian emigrants to England
Alumni of the London School of Economics
Year of birth missing (living people)
Living people
Indian women
Malayali people
Schroders people
Mookerjee family
English journalists
Writers from London